Professor Colette Henry is an award winning social scientist from Ireland who publishes widely on entrepreneurship education, women's entrepreneurship and policy, veterinary business, and the creative industries. Winner of the European Entrepreneurship Education Award and DIANA International Research 'Trailblazer' Award, Colette is currently Head of Department of Business Studies at the Dundalk Institute of Technology.

Career and research 
Currently the Head of Department of Business Studies at Dundalk Institute of Technology, and Adjunct Professor of Business Strategy at Griffith University.

Previous roles include the Adjunct Professor of Entrepreneurship at UiT The Arctic University of Norway, Norbrook Professor of Business and Enterprise at the Royal Veterinary College London, and President of the Institute for Small Business & Entrepreneurship, UK.

Henry was also the Founding Editor-in-Chief of the International Journal of Gender and Entrepreneurship, and Founder and Chair of Global WEP, Women's Entrepreneurship Policy Research.

Education 

 1985 - BA Spanish & Italian, Modern Languages at Queen's University Belfast.
 1995 - MBA Business Administration and Management at The Open University.
 2000 - PhD Management, Entrepreneurship Education at Queen's University Belfast.

Awards and recognition 

 Winner of DIANA International Research 'Trailblazer' Award from Babson College.
 Winner of European Entrepreneurship Education Award from Lund University.
 Fellow of the Academy of Social Sciences.

Selected publications 

 Henry, C., Coleman, S., & Lewis, V. (2023). Women's Entrepreneurship Policy: A global perspective. Elgar Online.
 Henry, C., Coleman, S., Orser, B., & Foss, L. (2022). 'Women's Entrepreneurship Policy and Access to Financial Capital in Different Countries: An Institutional Perspective'. Entrepreneurship Research Journal, 12(3). Available at: https://doi.org/10.1515/erj-2022-0234.
 Henry, C. (2021). Entrepreneurship policies through a gender lens. OECD Studies on SMEs and Entrepreneurship. 
 Henry, C. (2021). 'Is there a role for entrepreneurship education in veterinary medicine? A UK study'. Entrepreneurship Education and Pedagogy, 6(1). Available at: https://doi.org/10.1177/25151274211040423

References 

Living people